The 2001 El Paso mayoral election was held on May 26, 2001, to elect the mayor of El Paso, Texas. It saw the election of Raymond Caballero.

Caballero defeated former mayor Larry Francis.

Results

Primary

General election

References

El Paso mayoral
El Paso
Mayoral elections in El Paso, Texas
Non-partisan elections